Wee Bin born in China in 1823, was a Chinese migrant of the mid-nineteenth century who founded what was, at the time, Singapore's largest Chinese shipping firm.

At the age of thirty-three, Wee Bin founded Wee Bin & Co., under the chop Hong Guan, in 1856. The firm was based in Market Street, and became prominent in the 1860s. Wee ran the firm according to Western business practices. Wee Bin, through his firm, carried on business as merchants and shipowners. At first, he began business relations with various trading houses in Bali (then part of the Dutch Indies), and eventually became the greatest importer of products from that port. He also traded in all kinds of earthenware, and later on built up a fleet of over twenty vessels for the Chinese and Dutch Indies trade. With increasing interest in the tin mining industry and the need for more and more people to work the mines, Wee Bin was also responsible for carrying migrant workers from China to work in the Straits Settlements.

Wee Bin married the daughter of Kiong Kong Tuan. He died in 1868 at the age of 45, leaving an only son, Wee Boon Teck, and an only daughter. Wee Bin's daughter married Lim Ho Puah, who would later take over Wee Bin & Co., before passing it on to his fourth son Lim Peng Siang.

References

Further reading
 
 Koninklijke Paketvaart Maatschappij: stoomvaart en staatsvorming in de Indonesische archipel 1888-1914 - Volume 3 of Publikaties van de Faculteit der Historische en Kunstwetenschappen By Joseph Norbert Frans Marie à Campo, published by Verloren, 1992, 
 
 
 
 
 
 The Great circle: journal of the Australian Association for Maritime History, Volumes 6-9 by the Australian Association for Maritime History, published by The Association, 1984
 The Nautical Magazine, Volumes 163-164, Published 1950
 Parliamentary papers, Volume 108 by Great Britain. Parliament. House of Commons, published by HMSO, 1906 ( Item notes: v. 108 - 1906)
 Parliamentary papers, Volume 93 by Great Britain. Parliament. House of Commons published by HMSO (His/Her Majesty's Stationery Office), 1909
 
 
 Sociétés et compagnies de commerce en Orient et dans l'océan Indien - Volume 6 of Bibliothèque générale de l'École pratique des hautes études, Bibliothèque générale de l'École pratique des hautes études. Sciences économiques et sociales, Bibliothèque générale de l'École des hautes études en sciences sociales by Michel Mollat, Published by S.E.V.P.E.N., 1970
 
 
 
 Twentieth century impressions of British Malaya: its history, people, commerce, industries, and resources Author: Wright, Arnold (Publication Info: London, Durban, Colombo, Perth (W. A.), Singapore, Hong Kong, and Shanghai by Lloyd's Greater Britain Publishing Company, limited)

Singaporean people of Chinese descent
History of Singapore
People from Singapore
1823 births
1868 deaths